Dabasun Nor, Noor, &c. (Mongolian for "Salt Lake") may refer to

 Dabusun Lake, a salt lake in Haixi Prefecture, Qinghai, China
 Dabasun Nor, Inner Mongolia, a former lake in northern China

See also
 Salt Lake (disambiguation)